Gower Township is one of seventeen townships in Cedar County, Iowa, USA.  As of the 2000 census, its population was 528.

History
Gower Township is named for Robert Gower, who arrived in 1841 and led the efforts to build a bridge there.

Geography
According to the USGS, it contains three cemeteries: Honey Grove, Howard and Saint Josephs.

References

External links
 US-Counties.com
 City-Data.com

Townships in Cedar County, Iowa
Townships in Iowa